Little Norway may refer to:
Little Norway, military base in Canada
Little Norway, California
Little Norway, Wisconsin
Little Norway Park in Toronto, Canada
Kharian, a town in Punjab, Pakistan sometimes called "Little Norway"